Parahenodus is an extinct genus of henodontid placodont only known from a skull, discovered between 2008 and 2015 and described in 2018. It lived during the Late Triassic (Carnian–Norian). The skull, named and described as Parahenodus atancensis, was discovered in Keuper Facies of the Castilian Branche of the Iberian Range in the reservoir of El Atance (Sigüenza, Spain). It was the sister taxon to Henodus.

References

Fossil taxa described in 2018
Placodonts
Sauropterygian genera